Cryptanthus bromelioides is a plant species in the genus Cryptanthus. This species is endemic to Brazil.

Cultivars
 Cryptanthus 'Red Hot'
 Cryptanthus 'Uluwehi'
 Cryptanthus 'Wendy'
 × Neotanthus 'Charlien Rose'

Bibliography

External links

BSI Cultivar Registry Retrieved 11 October 2009
AN ALPHABETICAL LIST OF BROMELIAD BINOMIALS

bromelioides
Flora of Brazil